Callibaetis floridanus is a species of small minnow mayfly in the family Baetidae. It is found in Central America, North America. In North America its range includes all of Mexico, the southern, and northeastern United States.

References

External links

 

Mayflies
Articles created by Qbugbot
Insects described in 1900